Rainer Zimmermann (2 May 1942 – 25 October 2022) was an East German former handball player who competed in the 1972 Summer Olympics.He was born in Glogau. In 1972 he was part of the East German team which finished fourth in the Olympic tournament. He played three matches and scored eight goals.

References
Rainer Zimmermann's obituary 
Rainer Zimmermann's profile at Sports Reference.com

1942 births
2022 deaths
People from Głogów
Sportspeople from Lower Silesian Voivodeship
People from the Province of Silesia
German male handball players
Olympic handball players of East Germany
Handball players at the 1972 Summer Olympics